Cassville Ranger Station Historic District is a national historic district near Cassville, Barry County, Missouri. It encompasses five frame and limestone buildings constructed by Civilian Conservation Corps in 1936:

 Colonial Revival style Ranger's Office
 Colonial Revival style Ranger's Dwelling
 Garage
 Warehouse
 Oil house

The site also has two stone carvings.  It continues to be used as a ranger station for the Mark Twain National Forest. It was listed on the National Register of Historic Places in 2003.

References

External links
Mark Twain National Forest

Civilian Conservation Corps in Missouri
Historic districts on the National Register of Historic Places in Missouri
Colonial Revival architecture in Missouri
Buildings and structures completed in 1936
Buildings and structures in Barry County, Missouri
National Register of Historic Places in Barry County, Missouri